There are two species of agama named Olivier's agama:

 Trapelus ruderatus
 Trapelus persicus